Minimal polynomial can mean:
 Minimal polynomial (field theory)
  Minimal polynomial of 2cos(2pi/n)
 Minimal polynomial (linear algebra)